Archibald Philip Primrose, 5th Earl of Rosebery, 1st Earl of Midlothian,  (7 May 1847 – 21 May 1929) was a British Liberal Party politician who served as Prime Minister of the United Kingdom from March 1894 to June 1895. Between the death of his father, in 1851, and the death of his grandfather, the 4th Earl of Rosebery, in 1868, he was known by the courtesy title of Lord Dalmeny.

Rosebery first came to national attention in 1879 by sponsoring the successful Midlothian campaign of William Ewart Gladstone. He briefly was in charge of Scottish affairs. His most successful performance in office came as chairman of the London County Council in 1889. He entered the cabinet in 1885 and served twice as foreign minister, paying special attention to French and German affairs. He succeeded Gladstone as prime minister and leader of the Liberal Party in 1894; the Liberals lost the 1895 election. He resigned the party leadership in 1896 and never again held political office.

Rosebery was widely known as a brilliant orator, an outstanding sportsman and marksman, a writer and historian, connoisseur and collector. All of these activities attracted him more than politics, which grew boring and unattractive. Furthermore, he drifted to the right of the Liberal party and became a bitter critic of its policies. Winston Churchill, observing that he never adapted to democratic electoral competition, quipped: "He would not stoop; he did not conquer."

Rosebery was a Liberal Imperialist who favoured strong national defence and imperialism abroad and social reform at home, while being solidly anti-socialist. Historians judge him a failure as foreign minister and as prime minister.

Origins and early life

Archibald Philip Primrose was born on 7 May 1847 in his parents' house in Charles Street, Mayfair, London. His father was Archibald Primrose, Lord Dalmeny (1809–1851), son and heir apparent to Archibald Primrose, 4th Earl of Rosebery (1783–1868), whom he predeceased. Lord Dalmeny was a courtesy title used by the Earl's eldest son and heir apparent, during the Earl's lifetime, and was one of the Earl's lesser Scottish titles. Lord Dalmeny (died 1851) was MP for Stirling from 1832 to 1847 and served as First Lord of the Admiralty under Lord Melbourne.

Rosebery's mother was Lady (Catherine Lucy) Wilhelmina Stanhope (1819–1901), a historian who later wrote under her second married name "the Duchess of Cleveland", a daughter of Philip Stanhope, 4th Earl Stanhope. Lord Dalmeny died on 23 January 1851, having predeceased his father, when the courtesy title passed to his son, the future Rosebery, as the new heir to the earldom. In 1854 his mother remarried to Lord Harry Vane (later after 1864 known as Harry Powlett, 4th Duke of Cleveland). The relationship between mother and son was very poor. His elder and favourite sister Lady Leconfield was the wife of Henry Wyndham, 2nd Baron Leconfield.

Education and youth
Dalmeny attended preparatory schools in Hertfordshire and Brighton, and then Eton College (1860–65). At Eton, he formed a close attachment to his tutor William Johnson Cory: they visited Rome together in 1864, and maintained correspondence for years afterwards. Dalmeny proceeded to Christ Church, Oxford, matriculating in January 1866. He left Oxford in 1868: Dalmeny bought a horse named Ladas, although a rule banned undergraduates from owning horses. When he was found out, he was offered a choice: to sell the horse or to give up his studies. He chose the latter, and subsequently was a prominent figure in British horseracing for 40 years.

The three Prime Ministers from 1880 to 1902, namely Gladstone, Salisbury and Rosebery, all attended both Eton and Christ Church. Rosebery toured the United States in 1873, 1874 and 1876. He was pressed to marry Marie Fox, the sixteen-year-old adopted daughter of Henry Fox, 4th Baron Holland. She declined him.

Succession to earldom

When his grandfather died in 1868, Dalmeny became 5th Earl of Rosebery. The earldom did not of itself entitle Archibald Primrose to sit in the House of Lords, nor disqualify him from sitting in the House of Commons, as the title is part of the old Peerage of Scotland, from which 16 members (representative peers) were elected to sit in the Lords for each session of Parliament. However, in 1828, Rosebery's grandfather had been created 1st Baron Rosebery in the Peerage of the United Kingdom, which did entitle Rosebery to sit in the Lords like all peers of the United Kingdom, and barred him from a career in the House of Commons.

Career
Rosebery is reputed to have said that he had three aims in life: to win the Derby, to marry an heiress, and to become Prime Minister. He managed all three.

Early political career
At Eton, Rosebery notably attacked Charles I of England for his despotism, and went on to praise his Whig forebears – his ancestor, James Stanhope, 1st Earl Stanhope, was a minister to George I of Great Britain. Benjamin Disraeli often met with Rosebery in the 1870s to try to recruit him for his party, but this proved futile. Disraeli's major rival, William Ewart Gladstone, also pursued Rosebery, with considerable success.

As part of the Liberal plan to get Gladstone to be MP for Midlothian, Rosebery sponsored and largely ran the Midlothian Campaign of 1879. He based this on what he had observed in elections in the United States. Gladstone spoke from open-deck trains, and gathered mass support. In 1880, he was duly elected Member for Midlothian and returned to the premiership.

Rosebery served as Foreign Secretary in Gladstone's brief third ministry in 1886. He served as the first chairman of the London County Council, set up by the Conservatives in 1889. Rosebery Avenue in Clerkenwell is named after him. He served as President of the first day of the 1890 Co-operative Congress.

Rosebery's second period as Foreign Secretary, 1892–1894, predominantly involved quarrels with France over Uganda. To quote his hero Napoleon, Rosebery thought that "the Master of Egypt is the Master of India"; thus he pursued the policy of expansion in Africa. He helped Gladstone's Second Home Rule Bill in the House of Lords; nevertheless it was defeated overwhelmingly in the autumn of 1893. The first bill had been defeated in the House of Commons in 1886.

Prime Minister

Rosebery became a leader of the Liberal Imperialist faction of the Liberal Party and when Gladstone retired, in 1894, Rosebery succeeded him as Prime Minister, much to the disgust of Sir William Harcourt, the Chancellor of the Exchequer and leader of the more left-wing Liberals. Rosebery's selection was largely because Queen Victoria disliked most of the other leading Liberals. Rosebery was in the Lords, but Harcourt controlled the Commons, where he often undercut the prime minister.
 
Rosebery's government was largely unsuccessful, as in the Armenian crisis of 1895–96. He spoke out for a strongly pro-Armenian and anti-Turkish policy. Gladstone, a prime minister in retirement, called on Britain to intervene alone. The added pressure weakened Rosebery.

His designs in foreign policy, such as expansion of the fleet, were defeated by disagreements within the Liberal Party. He angered all the European powers.

The Unionist-dominated House of Lords stopped the whole of the Liberals' domestic legislation. The strongest figure in the cabinet was Rosebery's rival, Harcourt. He and his son Lewis were perennial critics of Rosebery's policies. There were two future prime ministers in the Cabinet, Home Secretary H. H. Asquith, and Secretary of State for War Henry Campbell-Bannerman. Rosebery rapidly lost interest in running the government. In the last year of his premiership, he was increasingly haggard: he suffered insomnia due to the continual dissension in his Cabinet.
 
On 21 June 1895, the government lost a vote in committee on army supply by just seven votes. While this might have been treated merely as a vote of no confidence in Secretary for War Campbell-Bannerman, Rosebery chose to treat it as a vote of censure on his government. On 22 June, he and his ministers tendered their resignations to the Queen, who invited the Unionist leader, Lord Salisbury, to form a government. The following month, the Unionists won a crushing victory in the 1895 general election, and held power for ten years (1895–1905) under Salisbury and Arthur Balfour. Rosebery remained the Liberal leader for another year, then permanently retired from politics.

Lord Rosebery's government, March 1894 – June 1895
Lord Rosebery – First Lord of the Treasury, Lord President of the Council, and Leader of the House of Lords
Lord Herschell – Lord Chancellor
Lord Tweedmouth – Lord Privy Seal
H. H. Asquith – Secretary of State for the Home Department
Lord Kimberley – Secretary of State for Foreign Affairs
Lord Ripon – Secretary of State for the Colonies
Sir Henry Campbell-Bannerman – Secretary of State for War
Sir Henry Hartley Fowler – Secretary of State for India
Sir William Harcourt – Chancellor of the Exchequer and Leader of the House of Commons
Lord Spencer – First Lord of the Admiralty
Anthony John Mundella – President of the Board of Trade
Arnold Morley – Postmaster-General
George John Shaw-Lefevre – President of the Local Government Board
James Bryce – Chancellor of the Duchy of Lancaster
John Morley – Chief Secretary for Ireland
Sir George Otto Trevelyan – Secretary for Scotland
Sir Arthur Herbert Dyke Acland – Vice-President of the Council

Changes
May 1894: James Bryce succeeds A. J. Mundella at the Board of Trade. Lord Tweedmouth succeeds Bryce at the Duchy of Lancaster, remaining also Lord Privy Seal.

Later life

Liberal Imperialists

Rosebery resigned as leader of the Liberal Party on 6 October 1896, to be succeeded by William Harcourt and gradually moved further and further from the mainstream of the party.  With the Liberals in opposition divided over the Boer War which started in 1899, Rosebery, although officially politically inactive, emerged as the head of the “Liberal Imperialists” faction of the party, opposed to Irish Home rule. He supported the war, and brought along many nonconformists likewise. However the war was opposed by a younger faction of Liberals, including David Lloyd George and the party leader Sir Henry Campbell-Bannerman. Rosebery's acolytes, including H. H. Asquith and Edward Grey, regularly implored him to return as party leader and even Campbell-Bannerman said he would serve under Rosebery, if he accepted fundamental Liberal party doctrine. In a much trailed speech to the Chesterfield Liberal Association in December 1901, Rosebery was widely expected to announce his return but instead delivered what Harcourt's son and private secretary Lewis described as "an insult to the whole past of the Liberal party", by telling the party to "clean its slate". In 1902 Rosebery was installed as president of the newly formed “Liberal League” which superseded the Liberal Imperialist League and counted amongst its vice presidents Asquith and Grey.

1905 onwards

Rosebery's positions made it impossible to join the Liberal government that returned to power in 1905. Rosebery turned to writing, including biographies of Lord Chatham, Pitt the Younger, Napoleon, and Lord Randolph Churchill. Another one of his passionate interests was the collecting of rare books.

The last years of his political life saw Rosebery become a purely negative critic of the Liberal governments of Campbell-Bannerman and Asquith. His crusade "for freedom as against bureaucracy, for freedom as against democratic tyranny, for freedom as against class legislation, and ... for freedom as against Socialism" was a lonely one, conducted from the crossbenches in the Lords. He joined the die-hard unionist peers in attacking Lloyd George's redistributive People's Budget in 1909 but stopped short of voting against the measure for fear of bringing retribution upon the Lords. The crisis provoked by the Lords' rejection of the budget encouraged him to reintroduce his resolutions for Lords reform, but they were lost with the dissolution of parliament in December 1910.

After assaulting the "ill-judged, revolutionary and partisan" terms of the 1911 Parliament Bill, which proposed to curb the Lords' veto, he voted with the government in what proved to be his last appearance in the House of Lords. This was effectively the end of his public life, though he made several public appearances to support the war effort after 1914 and sponsored a "bantam battalion" in 1915. Though Lloyd George offered him "a high post not involving departmental labour" to augment his 1916 coalition, Rosebery declined to serve.

Personal life

Marriage

On 20 March 1878, 31-year-old Rosebery married 27-year-old Hannah de Rothschild (1851–1890), only child and sole heiress of the Jewish banker Mayer Amschel de Rothschild, and the wealthiest British heiress of her day. Her father had died four years previously in 1874, and bequeathed to her the bulk of his estate. The wedding was held (registered) at the office of the Board of Guardians in Mount Street, London. Later the same day, the marriage was blessed at a Christian ceremony in Christ Church, Down Street, Piccadilly. The Prince of Wales and the Queen's cousin, the army commander Prince George, Duke of Cambridge, were among the guests who attended the ceremony.

The marriage was a happy one. In January 1878, Rosebery had told a friend that he found Hannah "very simple, very unspoilt, very clever, very warm-hearted and very shy ... I never knew such a beautiful character." Hannah's death in 1890 from typhoid, compounded by Bright's disease, left him distraught.

More than a decade after his wife's death, in July 1901, it was speculated that Rosebery intended to marry the widowed Princess Helena, Duchess of Albany, widow of Prince Leopold, Duke of Albany, youngest son of Queen Victoria. Princess Helena was also the sister of Queen Emma of the Netherlands. However, Rosebery never remarried.

Progeny
By his wife Hannah de Rothschild, Rosebery had two sons and two daughters, with whom, according to Margot Asquith, he loved to play:
Albert Edward Harry Meyer Archibald Primrose, 6th Earl of Rosebery known as Harry (8 January 1882 – 30 May 1974) he married Lady Dorothy Grosvenor (granddaughter of Hugh Lupus Grosvenor, 1st Duke of Westminster through his third son Lord Henry Grosvenor) on 15 April 1909 and was divorced from her in 1919. They had two children. He married Hon. Eva Isabel Bruce (daughter of Henry Campbell Bruce, 2nd Baron Aberdare) on 24 June 1924. They had two children.
Neil James Archibald Primrose (14 December 1882 – 18 November 1917) he married Lady Victoria Stanley (daughter Edward Stanley, 17th Earl of Derby) on 7 April 1915. They had one daughter: Ruth Wood, Countess of Halifax.
Lady Sybil Primrose (1879–25 February 1955) she married General Sir Charles Grant on 28 March 1903. They had one son. 
Lady Margaret "Peggy" Etrenne Hannah Primrose (1 January 1881 – 13 March 1967) she married Robert Crewe-Milnes, 1st Marquess of Crewe on 20 April 1899. They had two children. As Lady Crewe, she became one of the first seven women appointed as magistrates in 1919 following the passing of the Sex Disqualification (Removal) Act 1919.

Sexuality
Throughout his life, it was rumoured that Rosebery was homosexual or bisexual. He was a notorious misogynist, and liked to surround himself with younger men.

As a student at Eton, beyond his close relationship with his tutor, William Johnson Cory, he likely had feelings for at least one fellow student, Frederick Vyner. He was devastated by his murder at the hands of Greek brigands in 1870, keeping the anniversary sacred for the rest of his life.

Like Oscar Wilde, he was hounded by John Douglas, 9th Marquess of Queensberry for his association with Francis Douglas, Viscount Drumlanrig, Queensberry's first born son – who had become his private secretary in 1892 when Rosebery became Foreign Secretary. A few months later he arranged for Drumlanrig, who was 26 at the time, to be made a junior member of the government with a seat in the House of Lords.

During the preliminary hearing of the case against Wilde, a letter from Queensberry was produced referring to him as 'a damned cur and coward of the Rosebery type'.

On 18 October 1894, sixteen months after his ennoblement, Drumlanrig died from injuries received during a shooting party. The inquest returned a verdict of "accidental death", but his death was rumoured potentially to be suicide or murder. It was speculated at the time that Drumlanrig may have had a romantic, if not sexual, relationship with Rosebery.

The suggestion was that Queensberry had threatened to expose the Prime Minister if his government did not vigorously prosecute Wilde for Wilde's relationship with Drumlanrig's younger brother, Lord Alfred Douglas. Queensberry believed, as he put it in a letter, that "Snob Queers like Rosebery" had corrupted his sons, and he held Rosebery indirectly responsible for Drumlanrig's death. He claimed to have evidence of Rosebery's transgressions but that was never confirmed.

Using a minor defeat in Parliament that didn't warrant such action, Rosebery resigned from the Premiership on 22 June 1895. This was a few months after the death of Drumlanrig and not quite a month after Wilde was convicted on 25 May, his life and reputation destroyed by a man who was also pursuing Rosebery for the same reason he was after Wilde. In August 1893, Queensberry had followed Rosebery to the spa town of Bad Homburg with the declared intention of giving him a horse-whipping, and had to be dissuaded by the Prince of Wales who was also staying there.

In his recollections, Rosebery wrote: "I cannot forget 1895. To lie awake night after night, wide awake, hopeless of sleep, tormented of nerves, and to realise all that was going on, at which I was present, so to speak, like a disembodied spirit, to watch one's own corpse, as it were day after day, is an experience which no sane man would repeat."

Sir Edmund Backhouse wrote in his unpublished memoirs that he had been one of Rosebery's lovers - although it has been suggested that many of Backhouse's claims were dubiously made.

Robert Rhodes James, who wrote a biography of Rosebery in 1963 (when homosexuality was still illegal in Britain), makes no mention of homosexual relationships at all, while for Leo McKinstry, who was writing in 2005, the evidence that Rosebery was homosexual is circumstantial. Michael Bloch, in 2015, has, however, no doubt that Rosebery was at least romantically interested in men, making him one of the four figures presented in the first chapter of his book on homosexual and bisexual British politicians of the 20th century. In his view, any remaining evidence (of which he gives a long list) can only be circumstantial in any case, considering Rosebery's paranoid taste for secrecy.

Death and burial

The last year of the war was clouded by two personal tragedies: his son Neil's death in Palestine in November 1917 and Rosebery's own stroke a few days before the armistice. He regained his mental powers, but his movement, hearing, and sight remained impaired for the rest of his life. His sister Constance described his last years as a "life of weariness, of total inactivity, and at the last of almost blindness". John Buchan remembered him in his last month of life, "crushed by bodily weakness" and "sunk in sad and silent meditations".

Rosebery died at his Epsom, Surrey home of The Durdans on 21 May 1929, to the accompaniment, as he had requested, of a gramophone recording of the "Eton Boating Song". Survived by three of his four children, he was buried in the small church at Dalmeny. By the time of his death, he was the last Victorian-era British Prime Minister alive.

His estate of £1.5million made him the richest prime minister ever.

Sporting interests

Horse racing
As a result of his marriage to Hannah de Rothschild, Rosebery acquired the Mentmore Towers estate and Mentmore stud near Leighton Buzzard which had been built by Mayer Amschel de Rothschild. Rosebery built another stable and stud near Mentmore Towers at Crafton, Buckinghamshire, called Crafton Stud.

Rosebery won several of the five English Classic Races. His most famous horses were Ladas who won the 1894 Derby, Sir Visto who did it again in 1895 (Rosebery was Prime Minister on both occasions), and Cicero in 1905.

Football

Rosebery became the first president of the London Scottish Rugby Football Club in 1878, also developed a keen interest in association football and was an early patron of the sport in Scotland. In 1882 he donated a trophy, the Rosebery Charity Cup, to be competed for by clubs under the jurisdiction of the East of Scotland Football Association. The competition lasted over 60 years and raised thousands of pounds for charities in the Edinburgh area.

Rosebery also became Honorary President of the national Scottish Football Association, with the representative Scotland national team and Honorary President of Heart of Midlothian FC. The national team occasionally forsook their traditional dark blue shirts for his traditional racing colours of primrose and pink. This occurred 9 times during Rosebery's lifetime, most notably for the 1900 British Home Championship match against England, which the Scots won 4–1. These colours were used for the away kit of the Scotland national team in 2014 and were Heart of Midlothian's away colours for season 2016/17.

Literary interests
He was a keen collector of fine books and amassed an excellent library. It was sold on 29 October 2009 at Sothebys, New Bond Street. Rosebery unveiled the statue of Robert Burns in Dumfries on 6 April 1882.

Landholdings

Rosebery was the owner of twelve houses. By marriage, he acquired:
Mentmore Towers in Buckinghamshire, a huge neo-Renaissance stately home, sold in the 1970s
Number 40, Piccadilly, in London.
With his fortune, he bought:
Malleny House and Garden in 1882
a shooting lodge at Carrington in Midlothian
a Georgian villa at Postwick in Norfolk
In 1897, he bought Villa Delahente in Posillipo, overlooking the Bay of Naples, currently an official residence of the President of the Italian Republic, still known as Villa Rosebery
38 Berkeley Square, London
The Durdans, Epsom, where he died in 1929.
As Earl of Rosebery, he was laird of:
Dalmeny House on the banks of the Firth of Forth (pictured)
Barnbougle Castle in the grounds of Dalmeny Estate, used by Rosebery (an insomniac) for privacy.
He rented:
a home in Randolph Crescent, Edinburgh, during World War I
Lansdowne House, in London, from the Marquess of Lansdowne.

Place-name tributes
The Oatlands area in the South Side of Glasgow was laid out in the late 19th and early 20th centuries, contemporary with Rosebery's most prominent period. The area is much changed since it was originally laid out, but several of the original street names had an association with him or areas around his estate to the northwest of Edinburgh: Rosebery Street, Dalmeny Street, Queensferry Street, Granton Street and Cramond Street.

In London, Rosebery Avenue, running between Holborn and Clerkenwell, was named after him, in recognition of his service as the London County Council's first chairman.

Rosebery, New South Wales, a suburb of Sydney, is named after him. A major street, Dalmeny Avenue, runs through the area. Rosebery, Tasmania is also named after him, via the name of a mining company. Dalmeny, New South Wales, a suburb on the New South Wales South Coast, is named after him. Roseberry Avenue in the suburb of South Perth, Western Australia, is also named after him. The former township of Rosebery in South Australia (now part of Collinswood) was named for him, as was modern-day Rosebery Lane in Collinswood. Rosebery in the north west of Victoria, some 15 km south of Hopetoun is also named after him.

Rosebery House, Epsom College, in Epsom, is named after him.
Rosebery School sits on an area of land given to the borough by Lord Rosebery.

In October 1895 Lord Rosebery opened the new Liberal Club on Westborough, in Scarborough, only months after being Prime Minister. The building now houses a Wetherspoons, which is named in his honour.

Ancestry

See also
Lady Stair's House

References

Citations

Bibliography
 Hamer, D. A. Liberal politics in the age of Gladstone and Rosebery: a study in leadership and policy (Clarendon Press, 1972).
 Jacobson, Peter D. “Rosebery and Liberal Imperialism, 1899 - 1903.” Journal of British Studies 13.1 1973, pp. 83–107. online
 Leonard, Dick. Nineteenth-Century British Premiers: Pitt to Rosebery (Basingstoke, Palgrave Macmillan, 2008)
 McKinstry, Leo. Rosebery: Statesman in Turmoil (2005) .
 Martel, Gordon. Imperial Diplomacy: Rosebery and the failure of foreign policy ( McGill-Queen's University Press, 1986).
 Raymond, E. T. The Life of Lord Rosebery (1923) online
 Raymond, John. "The First Phase" History Today (Feb 1959) 9#2 pp 75–82; covers 1847 to 1880.
 Raymond, John. "Office and Eclipse" History Today (Mar 1959) 9#3 pp 176–184. on Rosebery 1880 to 1895.
 Bloch, Michael. Closet Queens: Some 20th Century British Politicians (Little, Brown, 2015)  Chapter 1: Archie, Regie, Loulou and Bill

External links

Earl Of Rosebery 1847–1929 biography from the Liberal Democrat History Group
More about The Earl of Roseberry on the Downing street website.
 
 
 
 
 

1847 births
1929 deaths
19th-century British LGBT people
19th-century prime ministers of the United Kingdom
Alumni of Christ Church, Oxford
Bisexual men
Bisexual politicians
British Anglicans
British racehorse owners and breeders
British Secretaries of State
British Secretaries of State for Foreign Affairs
Chancellors of the University of Glasgow
Chancellors of the University of London
Archibald
Directors of the Great Northern Railway (Great Britain)
Earls of Rosebery
Midlothian, Archibald Primrose, 1st Earl of
Fellows of the British Academy
Fellows of the Royal Society
Leaders of the House of Lords
Leaders of the Liberal Party (UK)
Liberal Party prime ministers of the United Kingdom
Liberal Party (UK) hereditary peers
LGBT peers
English LGBT politicians
Lord-Lieutenants of Midlothian
Lord-Lieutenants of West Lothian
Lord Presidents of the Council
Lords Privy Seal
Knights of the Garter
Knights of the Thistle
Members of London County Council
Members of the Privy Council of the United Kingdom
Owners of Epsom Derby winners
People educated at Eton College
People of the Victorian era
Politicians awarded knighthoods
Presidents of Co-operative Congress
Presidents of the Royal Scottish Geographical Society
Prime Ministers of the United Kingdom
Progressive Party (London) politicians
Rectors of the University of Aberdeen
Rectors of the University of Edinburgh
Rectors of the University of Glasgow
Rectors of the University of St Andrews
20th-century LGBT people